Mpinga Kasenda (30 August 1937 – 7 May 1994) was a political figure in Zaire under Mobutu Sese Seko. Kasenda was the prime minister of Zaire from 1977 to 1979 and the foreign minister from 1993 to 1994. He was killed in a plane crash near the airport in Kinshasa.

Biography 
Mpinga Kasenda was born on 30 August 1937 in Tshilomba, Kasaï, Belgian Congo. He earned a doctorate in political science from Lovanium University.

On 29 January 1985, at Mobutu's recommendation Kasenda was elected First Vice Chairman of the Central Committee Bureau of the Mouvement Populaire de la Révolution.

Citations

References 

 

Victims of aviation accidents or incidents in the Democratic Republic of the Congo
1937 births
1994 deaths
Prime Ministers of the Democratic Republic of the Congo
Government ministers of the Democratic Republic of the Congo
Lovanium University alumni